Yun Im (윤임, 尹任; 26 July 1487 – 30 August 1545) was a politician, general, and soldier of the Korean Joseon Dynasty. He was from the aristocratic family of the Papyeong Yun clan (파평 윤씨, 波平 尹氏), and related to the Royal Jeonju Yi clan through his mother. He was the older brother of Queen Janggyeong, the second wife of King Jungjong of Joseon, and the uncle of King Injong of Joseon. He was also the nephew of Park Won-jong, and was titled as Prince Paeun.(파은군, 波恩君)

Family 

 Father − Yun Yeo-Pil (1466 – 1555) (윤여필, 尹汝弼)
 Uncle - Yun Yeo-hae (윤여해, 尹汝諧)
 1) Grandfather − Yun Bo (? – 1494) (윤보, 尹甫)
 2) Great-Grandfather − Yun Sa-yoon (윤사윤, 尹士昀) (1409 - 7 December 1461); Queen Jeonghui’s second older brother
 3) Great-Great-Grandfather − Yun Byeon (윤번, 尹璠) (1384 - 1448); Queen Jeonghui’s father 
 4) Great-Great-Great-Grandfather − Yun Seung-rye (윤승례, 尹承禮) (? - 13 October 1397)
 5) Great-Great-Great-Great-Grandfather − Yun Cheok (윤척, 尹陟)
 5) Great-Great-Great-Great-Grandmother − Lady Yi of the Jeonui Yi clan (전의 이씨)
 4) Great-Great-Great-Grandmother − Lady Gwon of the Andong Gwon clan (안동 권씨)
 3) Great-Great-Grandmother − Grand Internal Princess Consort Hongnyeong of the Incheon Lee clan (흥녕부대부인 인천 이씨)
 2) Great-Grandmother − Lady Choi of the Suwon Choi clan (부산현부인 수원 최씨, 釜山縣夫人 水原崔氏)
 1) Grandmother − Lady Yi of the Jeonju Yi clan (정부인 전주 이씨, 貞夫人 全州 李氏)
 Mother − Internal Princess Consort Suncheon of the Suncheon Park clan (순천부부인 순천 박씨, 順天府夫人 順天 朴氏) (? - 1498)
 1) Grandfather − Park Jong-seon (1435 – 1481) (박중선)
 1) Grandmother − Lady Heo of the Yangcheon Heo clan (양천 허씨)
 Aunt − Grand Internal Princess Consort Seungpyeong of the Suncheon Park clan (승평부대부인 박씨, 昇平府大夫人 朴氏) (1455 - 20 July 1506)
 Uncle - Grand Prince Wolsan (월산대군) (5 January 1454 - 22 January 1488); Queen Insu’s son
 Half-cousin − Yi Yi, Prince Deokpung (덕풍군 이이, 德豊君 李恞) (20 August 1485 - 26 March 1506)
 Aunt − Lady Park of the Suncheon Park clan (순천 박씨, 順天 朴氏)
 Uncle - Shin Mu-jeong (신무정, 辛武鼎)
 Aunt − Lady Park of the Suncheon Park clan (순천 박씨, 順天 朴氏)
 Uncle - Yi Tak (이탁, 李鐸)
 Aunt − Lady Park of the Suncheon Park clan (순천 박씨, 順天 朴氏)
 Uncle - Han Ik (한익, 韓翊) (1460 - 1488)
 Cousin − Han Se-chang (한세창, 韓世昌)
 Cousin − Han Suk-chang (한숙창, 韓叔昌) (1478 - 1537)
 Aunt − Lady Park of the Suncheon Park clan (순천 박씨, 順天 朴氏)
 Uncle - Kim Jun (김준, 金俊)
 Uncle − Park Won-jong (박원종, 朴元宗) (1467 - 1510)
 Aunt - Lady Yun of the Papyeong Yun clan (파평 윤씨)
 Adoptive cousin − Royal Noble Consort Gyeong of the Miryang Park clan (경빈 박씨, 敬嬪 朴氏) (1492 - 1533)
 Half-cousin − Park On (박운, 朴雲)
 Aunt − Princess Consort Seungpyeong of the Suncheon Park clan (승평부부인 순천 박씨, 昇平府夫人 順天朴氏)
 Uncle - Grand Prince Jean (제안대군, 齊安大君) (13 February 1466 - 14 December 1525); Queen Ansun’s son
 Adoptive cousin − Yi Pa (이파, 李葩) (13 January 1515 - 15 September 1571)

Siblings

 Older sister − Lady/Princess Papyeong of the Papyeong Yun clan (파평현부인 윤씨, 坡平縣夫人 尹氏) (1485 - 16 January 1536)
 Brother-in-law - Yi Yi, Prince Deokpung (덕풍군 이이, 德豊君 李恞) (1485 - 1506)
 Nephew − Yi Ju, Prince Parim (파림군 이주, 坡林君 李珘) (1500 - 1541)
 Nephew − Yi Yu, Prince Gyerim (계림군 이유, 桂林君 李瑠) (1502 - 1545)
 Niece-in-law - Princess Consort Yeongchang of the Juksan Ahn clan (연창군부인 죽산 안씨, 延昌郡夫人 竹山 安氏)
 Niece-in-law - Princess Consort Ohcheon of the Yeonil Jeong clan (오천군부인 연일 정씨, 烏川郡夫人 延日 鄭氏)
 Grandnephew - Yi Si (연양정 이시, 延陽正 李諟)
 Niece-in-law - Lady No of the Gyoha No clan (교하 노씨, 交河 盧氏)
 Grandnephew - Yi Hyeong (이형, 李詗)
 Grandnephew - Yi Hu (이후, 李詡)
 Grandnephew - Yi Hoe, Prince Jeongyang (정양군 이회, 李誨)
 Grandnephew - Yi Ryang, Prince Eunyang (은양군 이량, 李諒)
 Grandniece - Lady Yi of the Jeonju Yi clan (전주 이씨, 全州 李氏)
 Grandniece - Lady Yi of the Jeonju Yi clan (전주 이씨, 全州 李氏)
 Nephew − Yi Ri (전성부정 이리, 全城副正 李璃)
 Older sister − Princess Consort Papyeong of the Papyeong Yun clan (파평군부인 윤씨, 坡平郡夫人 尹氏)
 Brother-in-law - Yi Jeong, Prince Palgye (팔계군 이정, 八溪君 李淨)
 Younger sister − Yun Cheon-deok (윤천덕, 尹千德), Lady Yun of the Papyeong Yun clan (1488 - ?)
 Brother-in-law - Kim Hun (김혼, 金渾) of the Gangneung Kim clan
 Younger sister - Yun Myeong-hye (윤명헤), Queen Janggyeong of the Papyeong Yun clan (10 August 1491 – 16 March 1515) (장경왕후 윤씨) 
 Brother-in-law - Yi Yeok, King Jungjong (16 April 1488 – 29 November 1544) (조선 중종)
 Niece - Yi Ok-ha (이옥하, 李玉荷), Princess Hyohye (13 June 1511 – 6 May 1531) (효혜공주)
 Nephew-in-law - Kim Hui (? – 1531) (김희); son of Kim Ahn-ro (김안로, 金安老)
 Grandniece − Kim Seon-ok (김선옥, 金善玉) of the Yeonan Kim clan (연안 김씨, 延安 金氏) (1531 - ?)
 Grandnephew-in-law - Yun Baek-won (윤백원, 尹百源) (1528 - 1589); Queen Munjeong’s nephew
 Great-Grandniece - Yun Gae-mi-chi (윤개미치, 尹介未致), Lady Yun of the Paepyeong Yun clan (파평 윤씨, 坡平 尹氏) (? - 1589)
 Nephew - Yi Ho, King Injong (10 March 1515 – 7 August 1545) (조선 인종)
 Niece-in-law - Queen Inseong of the Bannam Park clan (7 October 1514 – 6 January 1578) (인성왕후 박씨)
 Younger sister − Lady Yun (윤씨, 尹氏) (1498 - ?)
 Brother-in-law - Yi Yeok-son (이억손, 李億孫) of the Jeonju Yi clan; Yi Yeong, Prince Cheongan’s son (청안군 이영, 淸安君 李嶸)
 Younger half-sister − Yun Ok-chun (윤옥춘, 尹玉春) (1518 - ?)

Wives and their children

 Lady Yi of the Yeoheung Yi clan (정부인 증 정경부인 여흥 이씨) (? - 1528); daughter of Yi Bo (이보, 李俌) and Lady Yi of the Gwangju Yi clan (광주 이씨)
 Daughter - Lady Yun (윤씨)
 Daughter - Lady Yun (윤씨)
 Son - Yun Heung-in (윤흥인, 尹興仁) (1516 - September 1545)
 Daughter-in-law - Lady Ahn of the Sunheung Ahn clan (순흥 안씨)
 Grandson - Yun Gyeong (윤경)
 Grandson - Yun Ho (윤호, 尹琥)
 Granddaughter-in-law - Hong Ok-hwan (홍옥환, 洪玉環), Lady Hong (1531 - ?)
 Grandson - Yun Bal (윤발, 尹 玉+發)
 Granddaughter - Lady Yun (윤씨)
 Grandson-in-law - Sim Gwang-bo (심광보)
 Granddaughter - Lady Yun (윤씨)
 Grandson—in-law - Im Eung-woo (임응우)
 Son - Yun Heung-ui (윤흥의, 尹興義)
 Daughter-in-law - Lady Han (한씨)
 Granddaughter - Lady Yun (윤씨)
 Grandson-in-law - Lee Geon-yong (이견용)
 Granddaughter - Lady Yun (윤씨)
 Grandson-in-law - Gu Sa-min (구사민)
 Son - Yun Heung-rye (윤흥례, 尹興禮)
 Daughter-in-law - Lady Yang (양씨)
 Granddaughter - Lady Yun (윤씨)
 Grandson-in-law - Lee Deok-eung (이덕응)
 Granddaughter - Lady Yun (윤씨)
 Grandson-in-law - Lee Hong-yun (이홍윤)
 Adoptive grandson - Yun Bal (윤발, 尹 玉+發); son of Yun Heung-in
 Lady Gwak of the Hyeonpung Gwak clan (정부인 증 정경부인 현풍 곽씨) (1517 - 1589); daughter of Gwak Han (곽한, 郭翰)
 Son - Yun Heung-ji (윤흥지, 尹興智)
 Daughter-in-law - Lady Park (박씨)
 Grandson - Yun Chim (윤침)
 Son - Yun Heung-shin (윤흥신, 尹興信) (? - 1592)
 Daughter-in-law - Lady Shin (신씨)
 Grandson - Yun Seong (윤성, 尹珹)
 Grandson - Yun Seo (윤서)
 Son - Yun Heung-chung (윤흥충, 尹興忠)
 Daughter-in-law - Lady Lee (이씨)
Concubines and their children
 Unnamed concubine 
 Son - Yun Heung-hyo (윤흥효, 尹興孝)
 Grandson - Yun Jong (윤종)
 Son - Yun Heung-je (윤흥제, 尹興悌) (? - 1592)
 Grandson - Yun Sang (윤상)
 Kisaeng Mae-hyang (기생 매향) — No issue.
 Jung-yi (종이, 終伊); slave of Prince Deokpung — No issue.

See also 
 Eulsa massacre
 Queen Jeonghui — Yun Im’s Great-Grandaunt
 Queen Janggyeong 
 Yun Won-hyung — Yun Im’s third cousin
Queen Munjeong — Yun Im’s third cousin

Notes

References

site web 
 Yun Im 
 Yun Im 
 Yun Im, Korean historical person's informations 
 Yun Im 
 Eulsa massacre 
 Eulsa massacre 

Korean military personnel
Korean politicians
Korean generals
16th-century Korean people
1487 births
1545 deaths
Papyeong Yun clan